The common pipistrelle (Pipistrellus pipistrellus) is a small pipistrelle microbat whose very large range extends across most of Europe, North Africa, South Asia, and may extend into Korea. It is one of the most common bat species in the British Isles. In Europe, the northernmost confirmed records are from southern Finland near 60°N.

In 1999, the common pipistrelle was split into two species on the basis of different-frequency echolocation calls. The common pipistrelle uses a call of 45 kHz, while the soprano pipistrelle echolocates at 55 kHz. Since the two species were distinguished, a number of other differences, in appearance, habitat and food, have also been discovered.

Taxonomy and etymology
It was described as a new species in 1774 by German naturalist Johann Christian Daniel von Schreber.
Schreber initially placed it in the genus Vespertilio, calling it Vespertilio pipistrellus.
In 1839, Keyserling and Blasius reclassified the species, naming it Vesperugo pipistrellus.
This classification stood until 1897, when Miller placed the species into the genus Pipistrellus, where it remains as Pipistrellus pipistrellus.
Its species name "pipistrellus" is derived from the Italian word , which means "bat."

The soprano pipistrelle, Pipistrellus pygmaeus, was formerly considered synonymous with the common pipistrelle. In 1999, it was formally split from the common pipistrelle based on differing echolocation signatures and a genetic divergence of 11%.
Despite being different species, the common pipistrelle and the soprano pipistrelle are able to hybridize, based on genetic analysis conducted in Poland.

Description
The common pipistrelle is a very small species of bat.
It has a short muzzle.
Its brown fur is variable in tone. It is common in woodland and farmland but is also found in towns, where the females roost in lofts and buildings when rearing young.

Biology and ecology

Reproduction
Courtship territories are usually in the vicinity of popular winter roosts for the species.
Males will patrol these territories while "singing" to attract the attention of female bats as they travel to winter roosts.
Male courtship territories are densely-packed, offering female choice akin to a lek mating system.
While copulation occurs in the fall, fertilization does not occur until after its hibernation due to female sperm storage.
Females are pregnant in May and June.
Pregnant females form large aggregations in roosts, called maternity colonies.
Colonies can consist of dozens or hundreds of individuals.
Parturition usually occurs in June.
The litter size is usually one young, called a pup, though in some populations, twins are regularly produced.
Females nurse their pups through July; pups are usually weaned by August.
Females reach sexual maturity at one year of age.

Foraging and diet
The common pipistrelle is an edge specialist, preferring to forage along woodland edges and along isolated tree lines.
It is insectivorous, preying on flies, caddisflies, lacewings, and mayflies.
Mosquitoes, midges, and gnats are particularly favored prey items.

Echolocation
The frequencies used by this bat species for echolocation lie between 45 and 76 kHz, have most energy at 47 kHz and have an average duration of 5.6 ms.

Range and habitat
It has a Palearctic distribution.
It occurs in the British Isles, southern Scandinavia, much of Continental Europe, and parts of Northwest Africa.
It is also found in India, China, and Myanmar in Asia.

Conservation
It has been called the most common and abundant species of bat in Continental Europe and the United Kingdom.
Notably, however, these judgments were made before it was split into two species in 1999.
The common pipistrelle is considered least concern by the IUCN.
It meets the criteria for this classification because it has a large geographic range and a presumed large population.
As of 2008, the IUCN noted that there was no evidence of a rapid population decline.
However, it is a species of conservation concern in the United Kingdom, where the government created a Species Action Plan to restore its population to pre-1979 levels.
Its decline in the UK has been attributed to loss of foraging habitat due to agriculture intensification.

Further reading
Dick, A. and Roche, N. 2017 Google Earth and Google Street View reveal differences in Pipistrellus pipistrellus and Pipistrellus pygmaeus roadside habitat use in Ireland. Irish Naturalists' Journal 35(2) 83 - 93

References

External links
 
ARKive Pipistrellus pipistrellus and Pipistrellus pygmaeus photographs and videos.

Pipistrellus
Taxa named by Johann Christian Daniel von Schreber
Mammals described in 1774
Bats of Africa
Bats of Asia
Bats of Europe
Mammals of Afghanistan
Mammals of the Middle East
Mammals of Azerbaijan
Mammals of China
Mammals of India
Mammals of Pakistan
Mammals of Turkey